Tarjei Frugård Strøm (born October 26, 1978 in Bergen, Norway) is a drummer for the Norwegian rock groups Ralph Myerz and the Jack Herren Band and Datarock.
He also co-hosted the radio show 'Sexy' on Norwegian radio channel NRK P3, along with Totto Mjelde.

Bands

Ralph Myerz and The Jack Herren Band 
The band was formed in 1997 when Erlend Sellevold asked for people to play percussion with him during a party in Bergen. Thomas Lønnheim and Tarjei Strøm showed up through a combination of mutual contacts and high-school friendship. Supposedly a one-time-event, they had so much fun playing together that they decided to form a band, and Ralph Myerz & The Jack Herren Band was formed. After releasing a 7" and a 12" on the Norwegian record label Tellé Records. Those limited releases were followed by some attention from magazines and dj's around Europe, including Dimitri from Paris who included the track "Nikita" on one of his Playboy Mansion CD-compilations. In 2002 they were signed by the US label Emperor Norton Records, and they released their EP, A Special EP. The album A Special Album followed one year later. It included the tracks "Casino" and "Think Twice", which both became hits in clubs across Europe, and commercial hits in Norway. During their touring promoting this album, the band was joined by guitarist Mads Berven on their live shows.

Datarock 
Strøm is also one of the touring and recording drummers for the Norwegian electronic group Datarock.

Discography (in selection)

His own projects 
With Ralph Myerz and the Jack Herren Band
1999: Nikita Single (Tellé Records)
1999: Brave New World Single (Éllet Records)
2002: A Special EP (Emperor Norton)
2003: A Special Album (Emperor Norton)
2004: Your New Best Friends (Emperor Norton)
2006: Sharp Knives & Loaded Guns (EMI Records)

With Datarock
2009: Red (Young Aspiring Professionals)

 Collaborations 
With Kings of Convenience
2000: Kings of Convenience (Kindercore Records)
2001: Quiet Is The New Loud (Virgin Records)

With Magnet
2003: On Your Side (Sony Music Japan)

With Julian Berntzen
2003: Waffy Town (Sony Music)
2004: Pictures in the House Where She Lives (Universal Music Norway)

With Ephemera
2004: Monolove (Ephemera Records)

With Christine Sandtorv
2006: First Last Dance (Ephemera Records)

With Maria Mena
2013: Weapon in Mind'' (Sony Music)

References

External links 
Datarock on FaceBook

Norwegian rock drummers
Male drummers
Living people
Norwegian composers
Norwegian male composers
1978 births
Musicians from Bergen
21st-century Norwegian drummers
21st-century Norwegian male musicians